Kenneth "Ken" Owen Buesseler (born 1959) is an American marine radiochemist. He is a senior scientist at the Woods Hole Oceanographic Institution.

Education
Buesseler studied biochemistry and cell biology at the University of California, San Diego, where he obtained a BA in 1981. In 1986 he obtained his PhD from the Massachusetts Institute of Technology and the Woods Hole Oceanographic Institution.

Career
Since 1983 he has spent the largest part of his career at the Woods Hole Oceanographic Institution, where he became a senior scientist in 2000. He is best known for his research on the marine radiation effects from the Fukushima Daiichi nuclear disaster, where he went on a scientific expedition shortly after the disaster. He has measured specific caesium levels since. He has also monitored the effects on the coast of the western United States. Buesseler has criticized the lack of a federal agency looking into the risks of marine radiation contamination in the United States. Buesseler previously did research on the effects of nuclear weapons testing and the effects of the Chernobyl disaster on the Black Sea.

Honors and awards
Buesseler was elected a fellow of the American Geophysical Union in 2009. He was elected a foreign member of the Royal Netherlands Academy of Arts and Sciences in 2013. He was elected a Fellow of the American Association for the Advancement of Science in 2018. Buesseler was cited by the Times Higher Education as the top cited oceanographer for the decade 2000 to 2010.

See also
Fukushima 50
Lists of nuclear disasters and radioactive incidents
Claudia Benitez-Nelson

References

External links
 Profile at the Biological and Chemical Oceanography Data Management Office
 Profile at InFORM

1959 births
Living people
American oceanographers
Fellows of the American Association for the Advancement of Science
Fellows of the American Geophysical Union
Massachusetts Institute of Technology School of Science alumni
Members of the Royal Netherlands Academy of Arts and Sciences
University of California, San Diego alumni
Woods Hole Oceanographic Institution